Elections to North Down Borough Council were held on 18 May 1977 on the same day as the other Northern Irish local government elections. The election used four district electoral areas to elect a total of 20 councillors.

Election results

Note: "Votes" are the first preference votes.

Districts summary

|- class="unsortable" align="centre"
!rowspan=2 align="left"|Ward
! % 
!Cllrs
! %
!Cllrs
! %
!Cllrs
! %
!Cllrs
! %
!Cllrs
! %
!Cllrs
! %
!Cllrs
!rowspan=2|TotalCllrs
|- class="unsortable" align="center"
!colspan=2 bgcolor="" | Alliance
!colspan=2 bgcolor="" | UUP
!colspan=2 bgcolor="" | Vanguard
!colspan=2 bgcolor="" | UPNI
!colspan=2 bgcolor="" | DUP
!colspan=2 bgcolor="" | UUUP
!colspan=2 bgcolor="white"| Others
|-
|align="left"|Area A
|bgcolor="#F6CB2F"|37.2
|bgcolor="#F6CB2F"|2
|17.1
|1
|0.0
|0
|20.3
|1
|10.8
|0
|0.0
|0
|14.6
|1
|5
|-
|align="left"|Area B
|27.8
|1
|bgcolor="40BFF5"|33.5
|bgcolor="40BFF5"|2
|18.0
|1
|0.0
|0
|13.1
|1
|0.0
|0
|7.6
|0
|5
|-
|align="left"|Area C
|bgcolor="#F6CB2F"|44.0
|bgcolor="#F6CB2F"|2
|26.8
|2
|12.2
|1
|8.2
|0
|8.9
|0
|0.0
|0
|0.0
|0
|5
|-
|align="left"|Area D
|bgcolor="#F6CB2F"|46.0
|bgcolor="#F6CB2F"|2
|35.0
|2
|0.0
|0
|5.0
|0
|0.0
|0
|14.0
|1
|0.0
|0
|5
|- class="unsortable" class="sortbottom" style="background:#C9C9C9"
|align="left"| Total
|38.5
|7
|27.3
|7
|7.2
|2
|9.2
|1
|8.3
|1
|3.1
|1
|6.4
|1
|20
|-
|}

Districts results

Area A

1973: 3 x UUP, 2 x Alliance
1977: 2 x Alliance, 1 x UUP, 1 x UPNI, 1 x Independent Unionist
1973-1977 Change: UPNI and Independent Unionist gain from UUP (two seats)

Area B

1973: 2 x UUP, 2 x Loyalist, 1 x Alliance
1977: 2 x UUP, 1 x Alliance, 1 x Vanguard, 1 x DUP
1973-1977 Change: Vanguard and DUP gain from Loyalist (two seats)

Area C

1973: 2 x Alliance, 2 x UUP, 1 x Loyalist
1977: 2 x Alliance, 2 x UUP, 1 x Vanguard
1973-1977 Change: Loyalist joins Vanguard

Area D

1973: 2 x UUP, 2 x Alliance, 1 x Loyalist
1977: 2 x UUP, 2 x Alliance, 1 x UUUP
1973-1977 Change: UUUP gain from Loyalist

References

North Down Borough Council elections
North Down